Saint Bernulf or Bernold of Utrecht (died 19 July 1054) was Bishop of Utrecht (1026/27–1054).

Bernold succeeded Saint Adalbold as Bishop of Utrecht on 24 September 1027, when he was appointed by emperor of the Holy Roman Empire Conrad II.  He was likely an official in Conrad's court prior to taking on the powerful post as Prince-Bishop: both an episcopal head and secular feudal lord within the Empire. A supporter of Conrad and his successor Henry III, Bernold was active church reform, helping to reduce episcopal power over monastic orders, helping to strengthen  the Cluniac order in his domains, weakening lay lords control of churches and church land, and aiding the Holy Roman Emperor.  For this, Conrad and Henry expanded his see, further angering local nobility. Bernold was friend of the future Emperor Henry III (succeeded Conrad in 1046), and traveled on Henry's 1041 campaign against the Hungarians. During Henry's visits to Utrecht in 1040 and 1042, he expanded the see.  A brief rebellion led by Lorraine nobility in 1046 was defeated by Emperor Henry, and the Council of Aachen in 1049 saw  Bernold's see expanded.

Bishop Bernold  established the Collegiate churches of Saint John (Janskerk) in 1040, Saint Peter (St Pieterskerk) in 1039, and St. Paul's Abbey and its church (St Pauluskerk). With the  “Mariakerk” (begun 1090), they form the outside of the Utrecht “Kerkenkruis”: the Church Cross formed by four churches and a cathedral placed at its center.

Bernold died on 19 July 1054, which is his feast day. His relics, including a cloth shirt, are venerated in Utrecht, and his cult goes back to at least the 14th century. In 1917, he was made patron of the Artist's guild of Holland.

See also
Guild of St. Bernulphus
Bishops of Utrecht
Henry III, Holy Roman Emperor
Utrecht

References 

 "Bernulf“ in: Allgemeine Deutsche Biographie, herausgegeben von der Historischen Kommission bei der Bayrischen Akademie der Wissenschaften, Band 2 (1875), Page 505, Digital version at German language Wikisource (Version of 20 July 2008, 02:38  UTC)
 Alban Butler, Paul Burns (ed.). Butler's Lives of the Saints: July.  Continuum International Publishing Group (2000) 

1054 deaths
Prince-Bishops of Utrecht
Dutch Roman Catholic saints
11th-century Roman Catholic bishops in the Holy Roman Empire
11th-century Christian saints
Medieval Dutch saints
Year of birth unknown